McCrystal is a surname. Notable people with the surname include:

Cal McCrystal (journalist), British journalist
Eamonn McCrystal (tenor), Northern Irish Singer
Cal McCrystal (director), British theatre director, son of the above
Damien McCrystal, British journalist, son of the journalist Cal McCrystal
Eve McCrystal, Irish cyclist
Kevin McCrystal, Gaelic football manager

See also
McChrystal